Sivakorn Pu-udom (born 26 November 1987) is a Thai football referee. He referees in the Thai League 1, Chinese Super League and more international competitions.

Sivakorn became a FIFA elite referee class in 2013.

References

1987 births
Sivakorn Pu-udom
Living people
Sivakorn Pu-udom